Spider-Man  is a side-scrolling action game developed by Western Technologies and published by Acclaim and LJN in  1994 and 1995, based on the 1994–1998 animated series of the same name. The game was released for the Genesis and the Super NES. The two versions of the game have the same basic story but have gameplay, level, and enemy differences.

This was the last Spider-Man game published by Acclaim and LJN; the license of Spider-Man Games was passed to Activision from 5 years later in 2000.

Gameplay
The game is a side-scrolling platformer. There are six levels in the SNES version: Laboratory, Construction Zone, Brooklyn Bridge, Coney Island, a showdown in J. Jonah Jameson's Penthouse, and Ravencroft Asylum, and five in the Genesis version: Laboratory, Coney Island and the Funhouse, The Deconstruction Zone, The Mean Streets of the City, and The Ravencroft Prison for the Insane.

Plot
After being incarcerated by Spider-Man, Doctor Octopus swears revenge and escapes prison. Meanwhile, Oscorp plummets and goes bankrupt, causing Norman Osborn’s Green Goblin persona to resurface. Doctor Octopus and Green Goblin both attack the city, running into each other and proposing partnership. Octopus accepts and the two hire Mac Gargan and use the skills of scientist Curt Connors to turn him into a mercenary named Scorpion. Later, Spider-Man is swinging through the city when the villains attack, complete with Connors as Lizard and several Spider Slayers led by Alistair Smythe, who has mutated himself into a massive cyborg creature. Spider-Man attempts to stop the villains, but they easily defeat him and Spider-Man becomes disheartened, though he swears to stop the villains, who have become the Sinister Six. Spider-Man makes his way across the city, stopping all the villains and eventually making his way to the headquarters of Octopus and Goblin. Spider-Man attacks Green Goblin and rips off his mask, revealing him to be Norman Osborn. Spider-Man is pushed off a rooftop by Octopus, and webs his way back up, avoiding Octopus’s tentacles and finally defeating both of the villains. Green Goblin reveals one more plan, a symbiote created from the Goblin Formula and Spider-Man’s DNA named Venom. Spider-Man fights Venom (who attaches himself to a remaining Spider Slayer) and wins the battle. Meanwhile, Octopus and Goblin are arrested, but the symbiote is reported to have left the scene. Later, while looking in a Daily Bugle paper, the victories are attributed to Captain America, to Spider-Man’s discuss. In a post-credits scene, Eddie Brock is taking pictures of Octopus’s lab when Venom attacks him.

Reception
Next Generation reviewed the SNES version of the game, rating it two stars out of five, and stated that "there's some attempt at depth – like a few hidden rooms and cameo appearances by a number of other Marvel bad guys like the Lizard, for instance – but Spider-Man: The Animated Series is strictly a by-the-numbers affair". A GamePro reviewer described the Super NES version as more of "a thinking game than an action caper" due to the player character's weak fighting skills and the limited number and variety of enemies. He concluded the game to be more for intermediate gamers than veteran gamers.

The four reviewers of Electronic Gaming Monthly panned the Genesis version, criticizing it for limited animation, poor sound, a lack of interesting player character abilities, and unappealing graphics with little color. They gave it an average score of 4.25 out of 10. A reviewer for Next Generation also panned the game, chiefly for its lack of originality. He gave it one out of five stars, commenting that "the graphics, sound, story, and the whole game are so horribly familiar and boring that this game isn't even worthy of the one star we give it". GamePro gave it a generally positive review, citing the numerous Marvel Comics characters who make guest appearances, the comic book style of the graphics, and the imaginative enemies. However, they shared EGM's opinion of the sound and also criticized that the controls are inaccurate.

Notes

References

1995 video games
Acclaim Entertainment games
Super Nintendo Entertainment System games
Platform games
Sega Genesis games
Video games based on Spider-Man
Video games based on television series
Spider-Man (1994 TV series)
Video games set in prison
Video games set in New York City
Superhero video games
Video games developed in the United States